Glenea puella is a species of beetle in the family Cerambycidae. It was described by Chevrolat in 1858.

Subspecies
 Glenea puella assimilis Jordan, 1894
 Glenea puella puella Chevrolat, 1858

References

puella
Beetles described in 1858